Sam Merlotte is a fictional character from The Southern Vampire Mysteries/Sookie Stackhouse Series by author Charlaine Harris.

Sam lives in the fictional town of Bon Temps, Louisiana, and is the owner of a bar named Merlotte's. Sam has strawberry blond hair with blue eyes.  He is both a close friend of and the employer of mind-reading barmaid Sookie Stackhouse. Sam is a shape shifter.  His biological mother was a shifter just as his brother.  He is a shape-shifter in that he can take the form of any animal; although his preferred shape is that of a collie, he can change into any animal he has seen.  On nights when the moon is full, Sam - like all shapeshifters - feels a strong urge to change; the rest of the time he can do it at will. In the eighth book during the were war, instead of turning into a collie as usual, Sam unexpectedly changes to a lion to protect Sookie.  It is said that the enemy werewolves were even frightened to challenge him due to his now great strength, though he is eventually challenged by the enemy pack leader, who initially jumps on his back but proves to be no real challenge as he defeats her with little effort and then goes on to kill more werewolves brutally, as Sookie watches now under Claudine's protection.

Sam has expressed his interest in Sookie and has kissed her on more than one occasion, but the two have never actually dated.  He remains her good friend and supporter.  He is protective of Sookie and is both jealous and concerned when Sookie involves herself first with the vampire Bill Compton  and then Bill's employer Eric Northman. Under the guise of platonic friendship, he often advises Sookie to get away from the vampires while she still can. Despite this, Sam is dragged into the drama that surrounds Sookie and other supernatural creatures on an irregular basis.

When Sam was seventeen, he was sexually assaulted by Maryann, a maenad, whose later visit to Sookie's hometown causes much chaos.

When Sookie unexpectedly discovers that Sam is a shape-shifter, she is hurt that he did not see fit to confide in her because she has always been open with him about her own condition. With time, their friendship recovers.

Background in the novels
In the book series, it is revealed that both of Sam's parents were shape-shifters. His father is dead.  Both Sam and his mother have kept their true nature secret from his human stepfather, brother, and sister.  Because only the first-born of a were couple inherits the ability to change, his younger siblings are just regular humans.

Sam drifted from town to town before deciding to settle in Bon Temps and buy the bar. Since the Weres and shifters publicly revealed themselves, Sam has mentioned that he is a U.S. Army veteran, as was his father. Sam has generally avoided long relationships, but has dated other Werewolves and shifters. Although he was always attracted to Sookie, he did not reveal it to her until after she began dating Bill Compton. They each tend to be more than a little suspicious of the other's choices in romantic partners.

Television portrayal
In the HBO series True Blood, based on The Southern Vampire Mysteries, Sam is portrayed by actor Sam Trammell, who first appears in the bloodcopy.com video “In focus interviews Merlotte’s patrons”, In the first season, Sam after Sookie chooses to date Bill engages in a brief sexual relationship with Tara Thornton. It's Sam that ultimately uncovers the identity of the serial killer in season 1 and manages to distract Drew Marshall just before he kills Sookie, rescuing her.

Sam is revealed in the second season to have had a sexual encounter with the maenad Maryann while he was still an adolescent. Maryann comes to Bon Temps looking for the now adult Sam, convinced that he is the sacrificial victim she needs to bring forth her god. Sam hires a waitress, Daphne Landry, who reveals herself to him as a fellow shifter. The two bond in their gift and begin a relationship until it's revealed that she's working for Mary-Ann, trying to lure him into a trap. Mary-Ann murders her through Eggs and Sam is the prime suspect, but he escapes prison by shifting into a fly. In the season's conclusion, Sam and Bill concoct a scheme to trick Maryann into making herself vulnerable, and succeeds in killing her by shifting into a white bull, which is the symbol for Maryann's god, with her defences down, Sam in bull form uses his horn to impale her and then transforms back to his human self to rip out her heart.

Sam was adopted as a child by the Merlottes, who then abandoned him when his abilities manifested at the age of 15. At the beginning of Season 3 Bill and Sam have a short seductive gay scene which is revealed to be a dream sequence, this is a consequence of ingesting vampire blood. Afterwards, Sam travels to Arkansas to find his biological family, the Mickens'. He discovers that his biological mother and younger brother are also shape-shifters, and that his father is hiding a secret. Soon after Sam meets his biological parents he learns of his brother Tommy is being forced into dog fighting due to him being a shifter for money. Sam eventually saves Tommy from his corrupt parents and takes him to live with him and then the troubles soon start. At the close of Season 3, Tommy reveals he cannot read. He is fired from his Merlotte's job by a drunk Sam. Tommy steals Sam's money and tries to run, but is shot and wounded by Sam. Flashbacks of part of Sam's earlier life as a thief are also revealed.

In Season 4 Sam has joined a group of fellow shifters and started a romance with Luna, one of its members. Tommy is lured back to his parents' and almost forced to return to dog fighting, but he kills them (accidentally killing Melinda). Sam helps Tommy dispose of the bodies - they seem to be slowly reconciling until Tommy uses newfound skin-walker powers to imitate Sam to fire Sookie from the bar and sleep with Luna. Sam kicks Tommy out for good, and Tommy then skinwalks as Sam and meets Marcus, Luna's jealous werewolf ex-boyfriend, and antagonized him into a fight. Marcus and members of his pack fatally beat Tommy, but Sam and Tommy manage to reconcile moments before Tommy's death. Sam and Alcide confront Marcus and Alcide kills him in the ensuing struggle.

In season 5, members of Sam's shifter circle are killed by mysterious masked assailants. They also try to shoot Luna's daughter Emma, who escapes to her grandmother Martha Bozeman (Marcus' mother) and her pack. The assailants turn out to be an anti-supernatural gang led by former sheriff Bud Dearborne. Sam and Luna eventually find the location and with the help of their shifter powers rescue a kidnapped Sookie. Emma however is kidnapped from Martha by Russell Edgington and Steve Newlin to be the latter's wolf pet and taken to the vampire authority. They manage to infiltrate it and rescue Emma but after Luna skinwalks as Steve Newlin to warn of the authority on TV, she dies.

In season 6, a short time after Luna's death, Sam is approached by Nicole Wright, a supernatural rights activist to tell his story. He rebuffs her, but he is approached by Alcide, now packmaster of Mississippi, to return Emma to Martha. Sam refuses, but Emma is taken by Alcide and Martha. Later, he encounters Nicole again as she and some allies approach the pack the way she did Sam before. Sam uses this distraction to take Emma back and rescues Nicole as she is attacked by the pack. They go on the run but are eventually sighted by Alcide's father. He eventually gives Emma back to Martha provided they don't return to the pack, he and Alcide make amends and he begins a relationship with Nicole, who he also senses is pregnant. 6 months later, Sam has become mayor of Bon Temps and signed Merlotte's over to Arlene, who renames it Bellefleur's.

In season 7, Sam is outed to all the residents of Bon Temps as a shifter after being seen by a local named Vince. A heavily-pregnant Nicole along with Arlene and Holly is kidnapped by Hep-V infected vampires. After they're rescued, she decides to move back to her parents' with or without Sam due to what she sees as the frequent dangers and 'craziness' of Bon Temps. Sam eventually agrees to go with her and writes a heartfelt goodbye letter to Sookie and a single-line letter to Andy Bellefleur simply to resign as mayor, leaving for Chicago without saying goodbye in person. In the show's final epilogue, Sam returns with Nicole and their child, now a toddler for thanksgiving at Sookie's house.

Fictional shapeshifters
Fictional businesspeople
Fictional bartenders
Fictional characters from Louisiana
Male characters in literature
American male characters in television
Literary characters introduced in 2001
The Southern Vampire Mysteries characters
Fictional victims of sexual assault